Acoustic II is the second acoustic compilation album by British progressive trance group Above & Beyond, released on 3 June 2016 through Anjunabeats. The album is the follow-up to their 2014 compilation, Acoustic, and includes acoustic versions of previously released music from their studio albums.

Track listing

Charts

References

External links
 Acoustic II album on Anjunabeats store

2016 compilation albums
Above & Beyond (band) albums
Anjunabeats compilation albums
Sequel albums